Dromcollogher/Broadford GAA is a Gaelic Athletic Association (GAA) located in the parish of Dromcollogher-Broadford in County Limerick, Ireland. It is a member of the West Division of Limerick GAA. The club has had some successes in the Limerick Senior Football Championship.

Football titles
 Munster Senior Club Football Championship (1): 2008
 Limerick Senior Football Championship (7): 2001, 2003, 2004, 2008, 2009, 2012, 2013 (runners-up 2000, 2007, 2015, 2016)
 Limerick Junior Hurling Championships (4): 1959, 1963, 1993, 2015
 Limerick Junior B Football Championship (2): 1992, 2008
 Limerick Junior Football Championships (1): 1998
 Limerick Intermediate Football Championship'''(1): 1999

References

External sources
 Limerick GAA site

Gaelic games clubs in County Limerick
Gaelic football clubs in County Limerick